Gülcan Kamps (née Karahancı, born 20 September 1982) is a German TV presenter and video jockey of Turkish descent.

Career
After finishing her Abitur (A-level) in Lübeck, she decided to embark on a career in management economics. During this time, she was chosen by VIVA from among a pool of 500 hopefuls in a VJ search. In 2004, teaming up with Mustafa Sandal she got onto the European top 10 music charts with Aya Benzer. In 2004, she placed 2nd in Maxim Magazine's women of the year in television. She also placed 60th in FHM Germany's 100 sexiest women and 71st for 2005.

Since 2004, Gülcan has been involved in many charitable purposes such as with UNICEF for the  "1 Viennese Tulip Ball". Since January 2005, she has moderated the interactive live show 17 together with Janin Reinhardt and Klaas Heufer-Umlauf. She has also taken up presenting a karaoke show called "Shibuya" which also airs on VIVA.

On 7 July 2007 she presented at Live Earth.

Personal life
On 7 August 2007, Gülcan married Sebastian Kamps, the son of Heiner Kamps, the founder of the Kamps bakery chain.

References

External links
Gülcan on Viva.tv

1982 births
Living people
German people of Turkish descent
People from Lübeck
German television presenters